Conquest of Pangea is a strategy board game, where players control evolving species battling to control sections of the mega-continent Pangea.  It was released by Winning Moves Games USA in 2006 as the second game in its Immortal Eyes line.  It has one expansion, Conquest of Pangea: Atlantis, which adds a new piece to the board (Atlantis) and some additional rules, as well as a few rule revisions.  Neither game is in production.

Gameplay 
The point of the game is to gain the most "dominance points" before the continent of Pangea has broken apart.  These are earned by controlling different areas on the board, each of which has a terrain type that is randomly assigned at the beginning of the game.  The game is played over a number of turns, where each turn, a player is given five "power points".  The player spends these points to take different actions, such as increasing the units in a controlled area, moving to an area he controls, and battling with an opponent for control of an adjacent area.  When a player gains control of two or more areas with a similar terrain type, his species gains a new power, represented on a power card.  Additionally, a player gains power cards based on the actions performed during the turn.  These power cards can be used to help in battles or to gain additional "power points" towards more actions on a turn.  At the end of each turn, the player flips over an event card and determines what event occurs as well as how much time has passed.  Once the action occurs, the card is place in a row and the total amount of time on the cards in the row is added together.  If 25 million or more years have passed (are in the row), the piece of the continent shown on the last card breaks away from Pangea.  Once all 6 smaller continents have broken apart, the game ends and the person with the most "dominance points" wins.

External links 
 

Board games introduced in 2006
Biology-themed board games
Winning Moves games